Mutant League is an animated series based on the video games Mutant League Football and Mutant League Hockey which aired from July 2, 1994 to February 24, 1996. The show ran for two seasons, with the second typically incorporating more poignant stories and issues, while the first seemed somewhat hodgepodge with little regard for continuity (the Monsters have one win streak that ends twice, for instance). There are forty episodes in all, thirteen in Season 1 and twenty-seven in Season 2. The series was distributed by Claster Television and Produced by Franklin/Waterman 2 Productions in association with Electronic Arts.

Plot
During a football game, an earthquake reveals buried toxic waste, and the fumes cause all of the attendees and players to mutate, including young Bones Justice (Bones Jackson in the games) a sports federation based around the superhuman beings, the Mutant League is formed and Bones grows up to play for the Midway Monsters. Corrupt league commissioner Zalgor Prigg constantly schemes to get the popular athlete to play for any one of the four teams he owns (Slayers, Evils, Derangers or Ooze), or if nothing else discredit him for refusing to join. Bones' search for his father and his personal quest to bring order to the league, are subplots throughout the series. Several other characters from the games such as Razor Kidd, Mo and Spew, K.T. Slayer, Grim McSlam and Coach McWimple regularly appear in the show.

Unlike the games, players did not die from their unique approach to contact sports; though frequently maimed to the point of losing body parts, through treatments in a machine called the Rejuvenator which bathed them in toxic chemicals, they would soon be as returned to health. The show also has no robot players (except in one episode where K.T. Slayer was benched by robotic clones of himself) and only five teams; the Monsters, the Slayers, the Ooze, the Derangers and the Screaming Evils. It also has the teams competing in all manner of sports, not just the ones seen in the games. Most commonly Football, but also hockey, basketball, soccer, baseball, volleyball and even monster truck races and sumo wrestling. As with the video games, all of these sports were modified with deathtraps and loose rules on violence to accommodate the near-indestructible nature of the players. Some episodes end with a "grudge match" between two particular players.

A line of action figures was released based on the show, but went virtually unknown.

Rumors of a Mutant League wrestling league surfaced featuring such characters as the Polluter, the Toxic Teacher and "Dad" (or possibly Butch Justice) but apparently never entered production.

Characters

Midway Monsters
 Bones Justice: The main protagonist of the series, an animated human skeleton. Bones joined the Monsters because it was the only team in the Mutant League that Prigg does not own. Bones seeks out Prigg to learn the truth about his father Butch Justice. He never takes off his shade and his eyes glow red when angered. In one episode, it is also said that he does not need to breathe when the arena is sabotaged by poisonous gas He is voiced by Dan Petronijevic.
 Razor Kidd: A mutant Lizard who was dumped by the Slayers and joined the Monsters. He and Bones begin as rivals but become close friends He is Voiced by Ian James Corlett in Season 1 and Richard Yearwood in Season 2.
 Mo and Spewter: Twin troll brothers with superior brawn, but minimal intelligence. They literally share a single brain, which they keep in either one of their flip-top skullcaps.
 Darkstar: A tough mutant who loves to fight anyone, because of his brutality and after inadvertently knocking down Prigg, as punishment, he was sent to the Monsters where he butts heads with Bones until he learned to play fair. Though he plays fair, he is still brutal to those who threaten his teammates Scott McCord.
 Thrasher: Daughter of Malone. She resembles a gargoyle with orange skin and a yellow fin that drapes over the top of her head like hair. She and Darkstar usually have arguments. Her entrance, as the first female player into the Mutant League, was controversial both for Prigg and the Monsters, but she eventually proved herself to the team. Another episode revolved around one of her stalkers She is voiced by Tara Strong.
 Elanore McWhimple: Owner of the Monsters He is voiced by Brian Drummond.
 Malicious Malone: Former Mutant League player-turned Head Coach of the Midway Monsters Scott McNeil.
 George McWhimple: Husband of Elanore McWhimple he is voiced by Rob Paulsen.
 Slick Toxin: A mutant high-school star athlete recruited by Bones Justice. He is the center of a single episode where, after being heart-to-heart to Bones, he decides to quit the league and return to school He is voiced by Vincent Tong.
 Cannonball: A mutant that served as the Monsters' baseball pitcher He is voiced by James Arnold Taylor.

Slay City Slayers
 K.T. Slayer: A troll with brute force and a vicious take-no-prisoners attitude. Slayer is also Prigg's right-hand mutant and team captain of the Slayers. He is the primary rival of Bones and will do almost anything to put Bones out of commission He is voiced by Jess Harnell
 Jackie LaGrunge: A dangerous 9-year veteran, LaGrunge has become even more deadly as this former hybrid evolves into a whiptoid He is voiced by Dorian Harewood

Derangers
 Joe Magician: A mutant obviously punned after Joe Montana, team captain of the Derangers He Voiced by Jim Cummings.
 Grim McSlam: A mutant with 4 arms and punned after Jim McMahon He is Voiced by Quinton Flynn.

Screaming Evils
 Madman: A demented hyena man, team captain of the Evils He is voiced by Aron Tager.
 Madboy: Son of the demented hyena man Madman He is voiced by Daniel DeSanto.

Ooze
 Liquid Lazer: The team captain of the Ooze. Among team captains, the most reluctant to follow Prigg's orders. His body can liquify and reassemble at will He is voiced by Thom Adcox-Hernandez.

Other characters
 Bob Babble: Main announcer for MLSN (Mutant League Sports Network), often seen at times, and frequently heard. He has a voice reminiscent of famed sports announcer Howard Cosell He is voiced by Nick Jameson.
 Sherry Steele: MLSN's human female reporter and a secret ally of the Monsters. She becomes close friends with Bones, and often serves as his moral center, particularly in an episode where Bones is temporarily left wheelchair-bound. As the series progresses, she falls in love with Bones, which she admits to in the series finale, just before Bones travels underground in search of his father She is voiced by Grey DeLisle.
 Zalgor Prigg: Corrupt commissioner of the Mutant League and owner of the Slay City Slayers. He was once a power-hungry businessman when he was human. The main antagonist of the series, he eats live spiders that come out of a humidor-shaped box on his desk. He also is somewhat self-conscious of a set of "knobs" that grow out of the top of his head, in a manner similar to hair plugs He is voiced by Martin Roach.
 Kang: A werewolf with a Don King hairdo, Prigg's personal assistant. He is frequently pounded on by Prigg for delivering bad news, but his worst fear is being tossed into a fiery pit of demonic lawyers He is voiced by Brad Garret.
 Jukka: A scientist working for Prigg. He is purple-skinned and always wears dark goggles. He runs the rejuvenation tanks, despite being employed by Prigg, he is often neutral, and has even helped the Midway Monsters from time to time He is Voiced by Jennifer Hale.

Episodes
There are forty episodes altogether: 13 in season one, 27 in season two.

Season 1 (1994)
"Opening Kick-Off" (Jul. 2, 1994)
"Frightening Disease" (Jul. 9, 1994)
"The Fugitive" (Jul. 16, 1994)
"The Teammate" (Jul. 23, 1994)
"Head of the Coach" (Jul. 30, 1994)
"Troublemakers" (Aug. 6, 1994)
"Collision Course" (Aug. 13, 1994)
"The Sumo Match" (Aug. 20, 1994)
"The Prize of Fame" (Aug. 27, 1994)
"Boneheads Whodunnit?" (Sep. 3, 1994)
"The Loser" (Sep. 10, 1994)
"Breakdown" (Sep. 17, 1994)
"All-Star Battle Royale" (Sep. 24, 1994)

Season 2 (1995–1996)
"She's a Girl!" (Aug. 26, 1995)
"Razor's Wedge" (Sep. 2, 1995)
"The Great Madman" (Sep. 9, 1995)
"The Bones Justice Story" (Sep. 16, 1995)
"The Retirement" (Sep. 23, 1995)
"Until You Walked in My Shoes..." (Sep. 30, 1995)
"Scandalous Cad: Part 1" (Oct. 7, 1995)
"Scandalous Cad: Part 2" (Oct. 14, 1995)
"The Ultimate Breed" (Oct. 21, 1995)
"The Recruit" (Oct. 28, 1995)
"Enter the Skeletoid" (Nov. 4, 1995)
"Hooked on Buzz" (Nov. 11, 1995)
"Shoeless Lazer" (Nov. 18, 1995)
"All-Star Game" (Nov. 25, 1995)
"The Outing" (Dec. 2, 1995)
"The Mental Game" (Dec. 9, 1995)
"Role Model" (Dec. 16, 1995)
"Strike" (Dec. 23, 1995)
"The Fanatic" (Dec. 30, 1995)
"Ultra Fear" (Jan. 6, 1996)
"City Course" (Jan. 13, 1996)
"The Comeback" (Jan. 20, 1996)
"Love Story" (Jan. 27, 1996)
"In My Father's Name: Part 1" (Feb. 3, 1996)
"In My Father's Name: Part 2" (Feb. 10, 1996)
"Sudden Death" (Feb. 17, 1996)
"The Hall of Pain Awards" (Feb. 24, 1996)

Release

Home video
A 69-minute VHS tape of the show was released in 1996 by Columbia TriStar Home Video, featuring episodes edited together into what was called Mutant League: The Movie.

Streaming
In 2022, Sony Pictures' YouTube channel Throwback Toons began uploading episodes of the series.

References

External links
 
 
 Mutant League art director Dwayne Ferguson's website
SPTI's Anime & Animation Brochure: Mutant League

1990s American animated television series
Animated series based on video games
Television series about mutants
1994 American television series debuts
1996 American television series endings
First-run syndicated television programs in the United States
Works based on Electronic Arts video games
Television series by Sony Pictures Television
American children's animated sports television series
Animated television series about monsters
Television series by Claster Television
Mutant League series